Hasan Khani may refer to:
 Hasan Khani, Fars
 Hasan Khani, Qazvin